The Scottish Football Writers' Association International Player of the Year (often called the SFWA International Player of the Year) award is given to the player in the Scotland national football team who is seen to have made the best contribution to the previous season. The award is given by the Scottish Football Writers' Association (SFWA).

List of winners

As of 2022, the award has been made 15 times and has been won by 12 different players. The award was first made in 2008, and was won by forward James McFadden. As of 2022, Robert Snodgrass (2) and John McGinn (3) are the only players to have won the award more than once. Three of the winners were playing with Celtic at the time.

Winners by club

See also
SFWA Footballer of the Year
SFWA Manager of the Year
SFWA Young Player of the Year

References

Scottish football trophies and awards
Awards established in 2008
2008 establishments in Scotland
Scotland national football team